Giro di Sicilia (English: Tour of Sicily) is a men's multi-stage bicycle race held on Sicily, Italy. The race was first held in 1907 and was won by Carlo Galetti. The race disappeared from the calendar after the 1977 edition won by Giuseppe Saronni, until it was revived by RCS Sports in 2019. The first edition of the revived race was won by American rider Brandon McNulty. It is part of the UCI Europe Tour, classified as a 2.1 event.

Winners

References

External links 
 Official site 
 ProCyclingStats

Cycle races in Italy
Recurring sporting events established in 1907
Recurring sporting events established in 2019
Annual sporting events in Italy
April sporting events
UCI Europe Tour races
Sport in Sicily